The Post Office (Banking Services) Act 1976 was an act of the Parliament of the United Kingdom. The act gave the Post Office greater power to provide banking services. It also opened up the market between Giro systems and banks for transfer services on behalf of the Treasury.

Provisions
The provisions of the act include:

Extending the power of the Post Office to provide banking services through the amendment of the Post Office Act 1969 and the Protection of Depositors Act 1963.
Giving the Secretary of State the power to set financial objectives to be achieved by the Post Office in providing banking services.
Making it the duty of the Post Office to abide by any such objectives.
Allowing the government to provide money to the Post Office for the purposes of its banking services in the form of public dividend capital.
Reducing the Post Office's debt incurred under the Post Office Act 1969 by £29.7 million.
Repealing Section 1(2) of the Post Office (Borrowing) Act 1972.

Repeal
The Post Office (Banking Services) Act 1976 was repealed by the Postal Services Act 2000.

See also

Postal banking

References

United Kingdom Acts of Parliament 1976
Postal system of the United Kingdom
Banking in the United Kingdom
Royal Mail